Camp Point Central High School is a public high school in Camp Point, Illinois, United States, and is the high school of Central Community Unit School District 3.  , the school had 280 students in grades 9-12.

Location
Central High School is located at 2110 North Illinois Route 94, Camp Point, Illinois, 62320. The campus is four miles northeast of Camp Point. The geographic coordinates are: .

Athletics
Central High School competes in the West Central Conference. Its mascot is a Panther, with school colors of black and gold. The Boys Golf team placed 3rd in Illinois state championship competition in 2005–2006, but has no overall team championships on record in athletics or activities. Central coops with nearby Southeastern High School for some athletics.

Notable alumni
 Paul Reuschel, Former MLB player (Chicago Cubs, Cleveland Indians)
 Rick Reuschel, Former MLB player (Chicago Cubs, New York Yankees, Pittsburgh Pirates, San Francisco Giants)

References

External links
 Central High School — Official website

Schools in Adams County, Illinois
Public high schools in Illinois